Peter Witherow (born 1987) is an Irish Gaelic footballer who plays for Donegal New York and, formerly, for St Michael's and the county teams of Donegal and New York.

He is from Dunfanaghy.

Witherow was part of the Donegal senior set-up from the reign of Brian McIver onwards and lined out for them in the Dr McKenna Cup and National Football League. He was panel member when Donegal won the 2007 National Football League. He was also a panel member when Donegal won the 2012 All-Ireland Senior Football Championship.

He played for Donegal Boston in 2008.

Witherow moved to New York in 2016 and took up work in a gym, having left the University of Limerick with a Masters in Sports Performance and obtained a graduate visa. Among those to assist him was fellow expatriate Ross Wherity. Witherow played at cornerback for the New York team against Sligo in the 2017 Connacht Senior Football Championship, having earlier played two challenge matches against his old side Donegal during Easter.

References

External links
 Official profile
 
 P Witherow at gaainfo.com

1987 births
Living people
Donegal Boston Gaelic footballers
Donegal inter-county Gaelic footballers
Donegal New York Gaelic footballers
Irish expatriate sportspeople in the United States
New York inter-county Gaelic footballers
People from Dunfanaghy
St Michael's (Donegal) Gaelic footballers